Luis Antonio Avilés Ferreiro (born 3 March 2002) is a Mexican sprinter specializing in the 400m.

Avilés won a silver medal at the 2021 World Athletics U20 Championships and a gold medal at the Athletics at the 2021 Junior Pan American Games.

Personal bests

References

External links
 
 Sports.org Bio

2002 births
Living people
Mexican male sprinters
Youth Olympic gold medalists for Mexico
Youth Olympic gold medalists in athletics (track and field)
Athletes (track and field) at the 2018 Summer Youth Olympics
People from Cuautla
Sportspeople from Morelos
21st-century Mexican people